Rottenegg may refer to:
Rottenegg, Geisenfeld, a village in Upper Bavaria, now part of the municipality of Geisenfeld
Rottenegg, Upper Austria, a village in Upper Austria
Rottenegg Castle, a ruined castle in Upper Austria dating to the 13th century

See also
Rotten egg (disambiguation)